Chundangapoyil Puthiyapurayil Rizwan (19 April 1988) is an Indian-born cricketer who plays for the United Arab Emirates national cricket team. He has played for the United Arab Emirates national cricket team since 2019 and was appointed Twenty20 International captain in 2022.

International career
He made his One Day International (ODI) debut for the United Arab Emirates against Nepal on 26 January 2019. In January 2019, he was named in the United Arab Emirates' Twenty20 International (T20I) squad for their series against Nepal. He made his T20I debut for the United Arab Emirates against Nepal on 31 January 2019.

In December 2020, he was one of ten cricketers to be awarded with a year-long part-time contract by the Emirates Cricket Board. The following month, in the UAE's first fixture against Ireland, Rizwan scored his first century in an ODI match.

In August 2022, Rizwan was appointed to succeeded Ahmed Raza as the UAE's Twenty20 International captain, with his first major tournament being the 2022 Asia Cup Qualifier in Oman.

Personal life
Rizwan was born in Tellicherry, Kerala, India. His father moved to the UAE in the 1980s, and when he was two years old the family moved back to Sharjah, where his younger sisters were born. Rizwan later returned to India to study engineering in Kochi, playing cricket for Kerala at under-19 and under-23 level. He moved back to the UAE in 2014 to work as an electrical engineer with Bukhatir Group.

References

External links
 

1988 births
Living people
Emirati cricketers
United Arab Emirates One Day International cricketers
United Arab Emirates Twenty20 International cricketers
Cricketers from Kerala
People from the Emirate of Sharjah
Indian emigrants to the United Arab Emirates
Indian expatriate sportspeople in the United Arab Emirates
People from Thalassery